The 41st Primetime Emmy Awards were held on Sunday, September 17, 1989. The ceremony was broadcast on Fox from the Pasadena Civic Auditorium in Pasadena, California. The ceremony saw the guest acting categories double, as they were now based on gender as well as genre. Two networks, Lifetime and USA, received their first major nominations this year.

After being nominated and losing for the previous four years, Cheers regained the title of Outstanding Comedy Series. L.A. Law also won Outstanding Drama Series after losing the previous year. For the second straight year, L.A. Law received 15 major nominations, making it the first show ever to receive more than 14 major nominations multiple times. With nine main cast acting nominations, L.A. Law tied the record set by Hill Street Blues in 1982.

Winners and nominees

Programs

Acting

Lead performances

Supporting performances

Guest performances

Directing

Writing

Most major nominations
By network 
 NBC – 57
 ABC – 40
 CBS – 35

By program
 L.A. Law (NBC) – 15
 The Wonder Years (ABC) – 11
 Lonesome Dove (CBS) – 9
 The Golden Girls (NBC) / Murphy Brown (CBS) / thirtysomething (ABC) – 7
 Cheers (NBC) – 6

Most major awards
By network 
 NBC – 15
 ABC – 7
 CBS – 5

By program
 Cheers (NBC) / Murphy Brown (CBS) – 3
 L.A. Law (NBC) / Midnight Caller (NBC) / Roe vs. Wade (NBC) / thirtysomething (ABC) – 2

Notes

References

External links
 Emmys.com list of 1989 Nominees & Winners
 

041
1989 television awards
1989 in California
September 1989 events in the United States